Fuse One was a group of jazz musicians who collaborated for two albums released on CTI Records and one album released on GNP Crescendo Records.

The albums Fuse One and Silk were produced by Creed Taylor. The first album was arranged by Jeremy Wall of Spyro Gyra, the second by Leon "Ndugu" Chancler of Weather Report and the third by David Matthews.

Membership was not concrete, but included Tony Williams, Joe Farrell, John McLaughlin, Stanley Turrentine, Wynton Marsalis, Larry Coryell, Lenny White, Paulinho Da Costa, Ronnie Foster, Stanley Clarke, George Benson, Todd Cochran, Leon "Ndugu" Chancler, Tom Browne, Dave Valentin, Jorge Dalto, and Eric Gale.

The liner notes to their first album described the group thus: "Fuse One is conceived as a forum in which major contemporary musicians perform according to their own musical disciplines and without the constraints that accompany leader responsibilities. Each player brings in new compositions and ideas."

Discography

Studio albums

Compilation albums

References 

American jazz ensembles
Smooth jazz musicians
Jazz fusion ensembles
CTI Records artists